= Sophie Paris Vietnam =

Sophie Paris
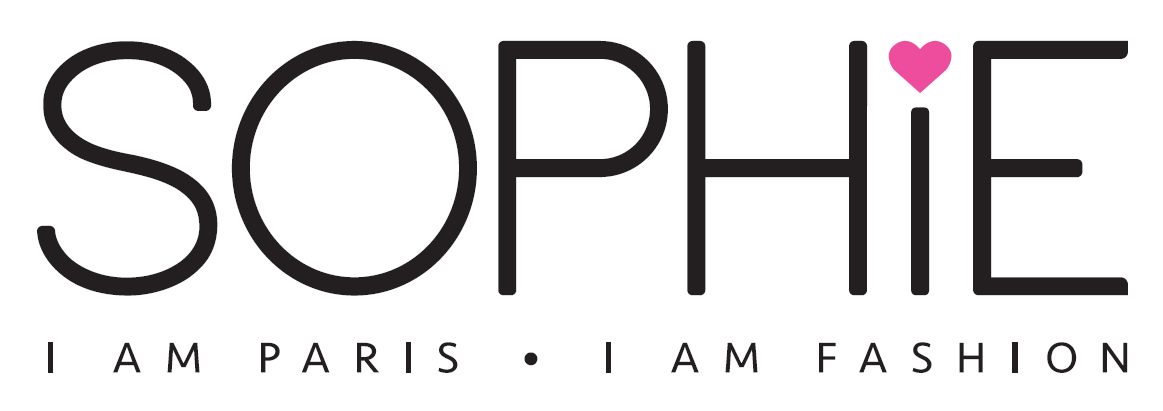
- Industry: Fashion
- Founded: 2010
- Headquarters: Ho Chi Minh City, Vietnam
- Website: sophieparis.vn

Sophie Paris Vietnam is the Vietnamese arm of the French-owned, direct-selling fashion company. With its head office in Jakarta, Indonesia, Sophie Paris provides fashion accessories and beauty products in Indonesia, Morocco, the Philippines, Malaysia, and Vietnam. The company employs more than 550 staff a year. It has more than 100,069 active members around the world.

== Company ==
Sophie Paris Vietnam was launched in November 2010 by Nick Johnson, General Director of Sophie Paris Vietnam, and has its office at 84B Tran Quoc Toan, Ward 8, District 3. Ho Chi Minh City. The catalogs are released every 45 days and feature French-designed products. The company opened with 45 staff and currently employs more than 80. The number of members increased to more than 20,000 in the first year with sales of more than US$4,5 million.

In May 2012, the company expanded by opening a rep office in Danang and, a few months later, a branch in Hanoi.

Sophie Paris Vietnam is a 100% foreign direct investment company, certified and recognized by the Direct Selling Committee of the American Chamber of Commerce in Vietnam where Nick Johnson served as the Vice Chairman during his time with Sophie Paris.

Currently, activities in Sophie Paris Vietnam have been halted.

== Products ==
- Bags
- Wallets
- Watches
- Cosmetics
- Sunglasses
- Belts
- Accessories
